George Caleb Wright, AIA, (April 25, 1889 – February 27, 1973) was an American architect from Indiana. He was a partner in the Indianapolis, Indiana, architectural firms of Pierre & Wright, Vonnegut, Wright & Yeager (formed 1946), and Wright, Porteous & Lowe, and was later chief building inspector for the City of Indianapolis.

Early life and education
Wright was born April 25, 1889, in Libertyville, Illinois, where he attended his education until the high school level. He then attended the University of Illinois from 1908 to 1912, earning a degree in architecture and engineering.

Early career
He worked for the International Harvester Company from 1912 to 1915, George C. Nimmons & Co. from 1915 to 1923, and Herbert Foltz from 1923 to 1925 until he formed Pierre & Wright. In addition, he was a construction supervisor during World War I for the army. He relocated to Indianapolis from Chicago in 1923.

Pierre & Wright (1925–1944)
Pierre & Wright, formed 1925, was responsible for many landmarks in Indianapolis and greater Indiana, and a number have been listed on the National Register of Historic Places.
The Pierre & Wright Architectural Records Collection is located at Ball State University Libraries' Drawings + Documents Archive, Muncie, Ind.

Vonnegut, Wright & Yeager
In 1946, Wright formed a new firm with Kurt Vonnegut, Sr., called Vonnegut & Wright. After Yeager joined the firm it became Vonnegut, Wright and Yeager, then Wright, Porteous & Lowe, and then Wright, Porteous & Lowe/Bonar.

Wright, Porteous & Lowe
Following Kurt Vonnegut Sr.'s death in 1957, he left Vonnegut, Wright & Yeager and was senior partner in the firm Wright, Porteous & Lowe. His son, William Caleb Wright, was also a partner in that firm. From 1963 to 1969, he was chief building inspector for the City of Indianapolis.

Professional organizations
He was a registered architect in Indiana, Kentucky, and Illinois and president of the Indiana Society of Architects and the Indiana Chapter of the AIA. In addition, he was a member of the board of the Indianapolis Construction League, Vice-Chairman of the Policy Committee, Indiana Construction Industry, member of the Mayor's Special Committee on Housing, etc.

Works by Pierre & Wright Architects

Indiana State Library and Historical Building, Indianapolis, Indiana
Milo Stuart Memorial Building, Arsenal Technical High School (Indianapolis, Indiana)

References

1889 births
Architects from Indianapolis
People from Libertyville, Illinois
Art Deco architects
University of Illinois alumni
Beaux Arts architects
1973 deaths